LA-37 Jammu - 4 (Narowal) is a constituency of Azad Kashmir Legislative Assembly which is currently represented by Muhammad Akmal Sargala of Pakistan Tehreek-e-Insaf. It covers the area of Narowal District in Pakistan. Only refugees from Jammu and Ladakh Settled in Pakistan are eligible to vote.

Election 2021 

General elections were held on 25 July 2021. Muhammad Akmal Sargala of PTI won by 26,039 votes and became the  member of Azad Kashmir Legislative Assembly.

Election 2013 

General elections were held on 21 July 2016. Mian Muhammad Rasheed of PML-N won by 26,440 votes and became the  member of Kashmir Legislative Assembly.

Azad Kashmir Legislative Assembly constituencies